Dickson Pillar is a pillar rock lying close south of Possession Island in the Possession Islands. The rock was mapped by the United States Geological Survey from surveys and U.S. Navy air photos, 1958–63, and was named by the Advisory Committee on Antarctic Names for Paul B. Dickson, U.S. Navy, Photographer of Squadron VX-6 on the flight of January 18, 1958, at the time this feature was photographed.

References 

Rock formations of Victoria Land
Borchgrevink Coast